The Baccalaureate School for Global Education (BSGE) is a New York City public high school located in the Astoria section of Queens, New York. BSGE was established in 2002.  It serves a student body of about 400 students between the 7th and 12th grades.  The is authorized by the International Baccalaureate Organization to offer both the MYP (IB Middle Years Programme) and also the IB Diploma Programme rather than the Standard State Curriculum along with AP exams for regular public schools. As per the U.S. News 2018 High School Ranking, BSGE was ranked #9 in the nation, and ranked #1 in New York. Applicants formally were required to succeed in an admission test along with satisfaction of other requirements according to the grade entered. However, this form of admissions was phased out for fully screened admissions in both the Middle School and High School programs.

As of the 2021 school year, the school had an enrollment of 579 students and 26.7 classroom teachers (on an FTE basis), for a student–teacher ratio of 17.8:1. There were 234 students (41.8% of enrollment) eligible for free lunch and 14 (2.42% of students) eligible for reduced-cost lunch.

References

External links
 Official School Website
 Profile on insideschools.org
 Profile on U.S. News
 Empty Bowls

Educational institutions established in 2002
Public high schools in Queens, New York
International Baccalaureate schools in New York (state)
Public middle schools in Queens, New York
2002 establishments in New York City